Smrčná is a municipality and village in Jihlava District in the Vysočina Region of the Czech Republic. It has about 500 inhabitants.

History
The first written mention of Smrčná is from 1233.

References

Villages in Jihlava District